Mitrofan M. Cioban (5 January 1942 – 2 February 2021) was a Moldovan mathematician specializing in topology, a member of the Academy of Sciences of Moldova (2000). 

He was born in Copceac (then in Tighina County, Romania, now in Ștefan Vodă District, Moldova), the son of Mihail and Tecla Cioban. At age 17 he enrolled in the Faculty of Mathematics and Physics of Tiraspol State University. After one year Cioban transferred to Moscow State University, where he started attending the Topology seminar of Pavel Alexandrov. He obtained his Ph.D. in 1969 with thesis Properties of Quotient Mappings and Classification of Spaces written under the direction of Alexander Arhangelskii. Upon graduation, he returned in 1970 to Tiraspol State University as a faculty member, where he directed 17 Ph.D. theses and served as prorector and then rector. 

He published over 200 papers in academic journals from 1966 to 2020, mostly under the names of Choban or Čoban, and occasionally Cioban, Ciobanu, or Coban. Starting in 1999 he served as president of the Mathematical Society of the Republic of Moldova, with headquarters in Chișinău.

He died twenty eight days after his 79th birthday from COVID-19.

Publications

References

External links

1942 births
2021 deaths
20th-century Moldovan mathematicians
21st-century Moldovan mathematicians
People from Ștefan Vodă District
Moscow State University alumni
Academic staff of Shevchenko Transnistria State University
Algebraists
Topologists
Titular members of the Academy of Sciences of Moldova
Recipients of the Order of Honour (Moldova)
Deaths from the COVID-19 pandemic in Moldova